Crisp Molineux (1730–1792), of Garboldisham, Norfolk, was an English politician.

He was the eldest surviving son of Charles Laval Molineux of St Kitts in the West Indies.

He was educated at Newcome's School, in Hackney, London and St John’s College, Cambridge (1748) and then studied law at the Inner Temple (1749).

He was a Member (MP) of the Parliament of England for Castle Rising (8 June 1771 – 1774) and for King's Lynn (1774 – 1790). He was High Sheriff of Norfolk for 1767–68.

He died in St Kitts in 1792. He had married Catherine, the daughter and heiress of George Montgomerie, MP of Thundersley, Essex and had a son and 4 daughters.

References

1730 births
1792 deaths
People from Garboldisham
People educated at Newcome's School
Alumni of St John's College, Cambridge
Members of the Parliament of Great Britain for English constituencies
British MPs 1768–1774
British MPs 1774–1780
British MPs 1780–1784
British MPs 1784–1790
High Sheriffs of Norfolk